The 2014 Tercera División play-offs to Segunda División B from Tercera División (Promotion play-offs) were the final playoffs for the promotion from 2013–14 Tercera División to 2014–15 Segunda División B. The first four teams in each group took part in the play-off.

Format

The eighteen group winners have the opportunity to be promoted directly to Segunda División B. The eighteen group winners were drawn into a two-legged series where the nine winners will promote to Segunda División B. The nine losing clubs will enter the play-off round for the last nine promotion spots.

The eighteen runners-up were drawn against one of the eighteen fourth-placed clubs outside their group and the eighteen third-placed clubs were drawn against one another in a two-legged series. The twenty-seven winners will advance with the nine losing clubs from the champions' series to determine the eighteen teams that will enter the last two-legged series for the last nine promotion spots. In all the playoff series, the lower-ranked club play at home first. Whenever there is a tie in position (e.g. like the group winners in the champions' series or the third-placed teams in the first round), a draw determines the club to play at home first.

Group Winners promotion play-off

Qualified teams 
The draw took place in the RFEF headquarters, in Las Rozas (Madrid), on 12 May 2014, 17:00 CEST.

Matches

|}

First leg

Second leg

Non-champions promotion play-off

First round

Qualified teams
The draw took place in the RFEF headquarters, in Las Rozas (Madrid), on 12 May 2014, 17:00 CEST.

Matches

|}

First leg

Second leg

Second round

Qualified teams
The draw took place in the RFEF headquarters, in Las Rozas (Madrid), on 26 May 2014, 16:30 CEST.

Matches

|}

First leg

Second leg

Third round

Qualified teams
The draw took place in the RFEF headquarters, in Las Rozas (Madrid), on 9 June 2014, 16:45 CEST.

Matches

|}

First leg

Second leg

See also
2014 Segunda División play-offs
2014 Segunda División B play-offs

2013-14
play-offs
3